Fichet-Bauche is a brand of safes and vaults with its origin in France. It specializes in products which offer certified burglary protection and/or fire protection. The brand is widely sold and marketed in France, Spain, Portugal, Italy and French speaking parts of Africa. Fichet-Bauche is a brand owned by the Gunnebo Security Group.

History

The Fichet company 

Born 7 February 1799 in Etrepilly, France, Alexandre Fichet opened a locksmiths in Paris in 1825 at the age of 26. He registered his first patent in 1829 for a safety lock and further patents followed in 1834 and 1836.

Shortly after, Fichet set up a small workshop in Paris and began expanding into the manufacture of safes. In 1840, he made his first modern fire safe made entirely of steel and using his now renowned, Fichet lock and key. As production outgrew the workshop, Fichet built a factory in Monceau in Paris, followed by a second in Lyon and third Marseille.

Fichet died in 1862 at the age of 63 and the business changed hands frequently from Loius and Apolline Bonnet, to Monsieur Charlier, manager of the workshops, and then to businessmen, Monsieur Guénot and Monsieur Pinot.

In 1879, the Fichet company built its first bank vault room with rentable safe deposit lockers. New factories were opened one after the other, most notably in Oust-Marest in the Somme region where security locks were manufactured. This factory was supported by the nearby “Fichet Village” and by a factory in Creil which made bank safes.

On the eve of World War I, the general partnership that was Fichet became a limited partnership, and came under the management of Jacques Bournisien and Marcel Beau. A factory was set up in Sens in 1917 and two years later branches were opened around the world, including Italy, Argentina, Spain, Belgium, Romania and Brazil.

The company was able to expand its clients’ security and installed its first industrial alarm and surveillance network in 1926. The day before World War II, Bournisien died, leaving Beau to run the company. He was aided for a time by Monsieur Nadaud, the husband of Alexandre Fichet’s great great granddaughter.

The Bauche company 
In 1864, Auguste-Nicolas Bauche, expert in fire resistant materials, began to produce safes and founded his first production factory in Gueux, near Reims in France. By 1867, the Gueux workshops had become too cramped. The factory was moved to Reims with more modern workshops incorporating a technological breakthrough of the time: a cementation furnace for the extreme hardening of the surface of certain steels.

This led to great advancements in the protection safes could offer. In 1879, Bauche demonstrated the efficacy of his fire safes with a live demonstration and several thousand francs emerged intact from a safe after having been repeatedly subjected to fire. Then the invention of the "ironclad" safe, both fire resistant and armour plated, in 1895 really made Bauche's name.

Bauche expanded with the creation of a factory in Feuquières. At that start of World War I in 1914, the factory fell into the hands of the Germans who, on their retreat in 1918, razed the building to the ground. Afterwards, the ruins were rebuilt and both production and research were started afresh.

In 1924, Bauche created a new anti welding torch testing, the focus of a new technology which would be used for many years to come. Working for the national defence ministry, the factory was destroyed once more by the Germans in 1940 and four years later was partially reconstructed as a repair workshop for American tanks. The company had to wait until well after the war before the factory was fully rebuilt.

The creation of Fichet-Bauche 

In 1967, Fichet and Bauche merged. The newly christened Fichet-Bauche company and focused on safes, safe deposit lockers, vaults and locks. The corporate headquarters was transferred to Clamart in Vélizy and, in parallel, a new factory was built in Carignan for the production of fire resistant safes. The Fichet-Bauche Group also expanded internationally during the end of the 1960s and 1970s.

A factory designed for the manufacture of vault room doors and safes was built in Barcelona, and new offices were opened in Argentina, Brazil, Portugal, Malaysia and Hong Kong.

Gunnebo Security Group 
In December 1999, Fichet-Bauche was acquired by the Gunnebo Security Group. With its factory at Bazancourt, Marne the company remained under its own name until 2007, when it was fully merged into Gunnebo, and the name became one of a number of Gunnebo brands of safes and vaults.

Reception
Writing in L'Union Ardennais, Guillaume Flatet commented that the Fichet-Bauche factory was resisting the economic crisis as well as its safes resist burglars, describing his visit as a rare glimpse into a quiet but well performing business.

Safe specialist Mike Palmer, writing on Insurance Surveyors.org, noted that Gunnebo had acquired major brands including Chubb as well as Fichet Bauche and John Tann, the world's first safe maker; Chubb and Fichet Bauche surviving only as brands, and John Tann's name disappearing, with the comment "How the mighty are fallen...".

Monocle magazine described Gunnebo as having "key holdings" including "French locksmith giant Fichet-Bauche".

References

External links
 

Companies based in Île-de-France
Manufacturing companies of France
Security equipment manufacturers